Abramishvili is a Georgian surname. Notable people with the surname include:

 Levan Abramishvili (born 1970), Georgian alpine skier
 Merab Abramishvili (1957–2006), Georgian painter

See also
 Abramashvili

Georgian-language surnames
Patronymic surnames
Surnames from given names
Surnames of Georgian origin